Shea Terrace Elementary School is a historic school building located in Portsmouth, Virginia.  The structure was built in 1925 based on a design by noted Virginia architect Charles M. Robinson.  The school opened in September 1925 serving Portsmouth's Shea Terrace neighborhood.  In a 2002 submission to have the structure listed on the National Register of Historic Places, the Virginia Department of Historical Resources noted the structure's association with Charles M. Robinson: "He is one of the most important Virginia architects of this period and his approach to school design and campus master planning continues to exert an influence today."  The building was listed on the National Register of Historic Places in 2002.

References

School buildings on the National Register of Historic Places in Virginia
School buildings completed in 1925
Buildings and structures in Portsmouth, Virginia
National Register of Historic Places in Portsmouth, Virginia
1925 establishments in Virginia